Nikola Stepanić Selnički  was a Catholic bishop of the Roman Catholic Diocese of Pécs (1596-1598) and Roman Catholic Archdiocese of Zagreb (1598-1602).  With his 1598 and 1599 activities aimed to impose his feudal authority over Serbs who populated a year earlier vast territories in Slavonia, abandoned for more than 40 years, he initiated the "Vlach question".

Early life 

According to Sakcinski, Selnički was born in Selnica near Konjšćina in 1553 in a family which is a branch of Turopolje nobility. According to some other sources Selnički was a son of Stephan from Bosnia, who descended from a noble family. He studied in at University of Paris and in Bologne.

He wrote a chronicle with detailed description of the 1593 Battle of Sisak which is not preserved.

Vlach question 

When Serb settlers came to Habsburg military frontier (in modern-day Croatia) they were settled on the land which remained vacant for more than 40 years. Soon after Serbs were settled in Slavonia, Selnički began with his activities against them. In 1598 Selnički received information that emperor Rudolf was going to grant Serbs privileges which would guarantee their status of people free from their feudal obligations. Selnički was the first of Croatian nobility who tried to impose his rule over Serb settlers. Furthermore, Selnički actually was the initiator of the "Vlach question" in Croatia with his intention to impose his feudal authority over Serbs, populated a year earlier on his estates by Varaždin general Sigismund.

In July 1599 Selnički requested that Serbs (Vlachs) populated a year before on the territory of his estates should not be given any privileges.

References

Sources

External links 
 Website of the Archdiocese of Zagreb, a page about Nikola Selnički

1553 births
1602 deaths
16th-century Hungarian Jesuits
17th-century Hungarian Jesuits
Anti-Serbian sentiment